Dennis Otzen Jensen (born December 2, 1974) is a Danish former swimmer, who specialized in sprint freestyle and butterfly events. He is a 2000 Olympian, and a member of Triton Swimming Club in Skovlunde under his personal coach John Ludvigsen.

Jensen competed in three swimming events, including all freestyle relays, for Denmark at the 2000 Summer Olympics in Sydney. He achieved a FINA B-cut of 55.31 (100 m butterfly) from the European Championships in Helsinki. In the 100 m butterfly, Jensen challenged seven other swimmers in heat four, including Yugoslav teenager Milorad Čavić (aged 16), who later disqualified for a false start. He raced to a fifth seed and forty-second overall by almost a full body length behind winner Simão Morgado of Portugal in 55.70. A member of the Danes, he also placed eighteenth in the 4×100 m freestyle relay (3:24.78), and eleventh in the 4×200 m freestyle relay (7:24.63).

References

External links
Profile – Svømmeklubben Triton 

1974 births
Living people
Danish male butterfly swimmers
Olympic swimmers of Denmark
Swimmers at the 2000 Summer Olympics
Danish male freestyle swimmers
People from Ballerup
Sportspeople from the Capital Region of Denmark